United States v. Causby, 328 U.S. 256 (1946), was a landmark United States Supreme Court decision related to ownership of airspace above private property. The United States government claimed a public right to fly over Thomas Lee Causby's farm located near an airport in Greensboro, North Carolina. Causby argued that the government's low-altitude flights entitled him to just compensation under the Takings Clause of the Fifth Amendment. 

The Court held that a taking had occurred and nullified the common law doctrine that ownership of property extended indefinitely upward. The court also affirmed that navigable airspace was public domain and held that flights which are so low and frequent as to be a direct and immediate interference with the enjoyment and use of real property constitute a taking. Much of the holding has been superseded by more recent cases and changes in the regulations relied upon.

Background
Thomas Lee Causby was a land owner less than a half mile from the end of the runway of Lindley Field, an airstrip in Greensboro, North Carolina.
thereby interfering with the productive use of the Causby farm.  Vibrations and sounds caused by the aircraft prevented use of property as a chicken farm, killing more than 150 chickens.  

The Court of Claims ruled that a land owner's domain includes the airspace above it, and ruled that Causby was entitled to just compensation for the government having 'Taken' his property by conducting overflights through the airspace above his property.

The United States appealed this ruling against them, and the Supreme Court agreed to review the case, regarding the contradiction between the common laws of property ownership (without any height limit) against the assertion of a federal claim that flights are made within the navigable airspace without any physical invasion of the property of the landowners, there has been no taking of property.

Holding
The Court recognized that a claim of property ownership indefinitely upward "has no place in the modern world." effectively nullifying the common law ad coelum doctrine. 

The Court affirmed the right to of transit through navigable airspace: 

However, the Court held that the flights occurred outside of navigable airspace:

Ultimately the Court agreed with the Court of Claims and held that a taking had occurred because flight occurred outside of navigable airspace :

This meant that the government conducting such low-level flights constituted a "taking" of Causby's property, and under the Constitution's takings clause, he was owed compensation.

On remand, the Court of Claims was tasked with defining the value of the "property interests" that had been taken from Causby by flyovers. The Court of Claims did not need to compensate the farmer for use below , because the planes did not fly below that height.
Compensation was owed based on the occupancy of the property, and not damage to chickens.

Dissent
Justice Black, joined by Justice Burton, dissented with the decision.
Black wrote that the majority opinion created:
... “an opening wedge for an unwarranted judicial interference with the power of Congress to develop solutions for new and vital national problems.”

The minority opinion was predicated on interference with private property being resolved at the State Court level through tort law, rather than in a federal court with constitutional jurisdiction. However, the U.S. government filed its appeal based upon an assertion of ownership to low altitude airspace, which the court roundly rejected, and as a case filed by the federal government it automatically became a federal court issue.

The dissenting opinion would have forced the issue of compensation into State court. The principle on which the dissent was based was later rejected in a 1962 ruling
that established that all federal “takings” claims need to be litigated in a federal court with jurisdiction over U.S. Constitutional issues.

Changes to reliance and precedent 
In determining that the flights had occurred outside of "navigable airspace", the Court relied on the definition of navigable airspace to reach a decision. At the time, this was defined as "airspace above the minimum safe altitudes of flight prescribed by the Civil Aeronautics Authority." However, shortly after this decision, Congress redefined navigable airspace to include "airspace needed to ensure safety in the takeoff and landing of aircraft." Currently, some aircraft, such as helicopters, balloons, and ultralights have no minimum safe altitudes. 

The question of whether takings can occur within navigable airspace has been addressed in later cases, most notably in Griggs v. County of Allegheny and Branning v. United States. The former case held that aircraft noise from operations within navigable airspace did amount to a taking.

See also
 Air rights
 Cuius est solum, eius est usque ad coelum et ad inferos
 Energy law
 List of notable United States Supreme Court cases
 List of United States Supreme Court cases, volume 328
 Property law
 Takings clause

References

External links
 
 

1946 in United States case law
Aviation law
Takings Clause case law
United States Supreme Court cases
United States Supreme Court cases of the Stone Court
Guilford County, North Carolina